Japan–Mexico relations are the diplomatic relations between Japan and Mexico. Both nations are members of the Asia-Pacific Economic Cooperation, CPTPP, G-20 major economies, Organisation for Economic Co-operation and Development and the United Nations.

History

Early history 

Under Spanish colonial rule, Mexico, then known as New Spain, controlled the trade routes between Manila, capital of the Philippines and the Mexican port of Acapulco. Through this trade route, Spanish galleons sailed from Acapulco to the Philippines and traded with neighboring countries/territories within the vicinity. Some of those territories were the islands of Japan. In Manila, Japanese trading boats would arrive and bring goods and food to trade with the New Spanish government. From Manila, Spanish vessels would transport the goods back to Acapulco, traverse the Mexican terrain until they reached the port of Veracruz and from there transport the goods onto another Spanish vessel to Spain.

In the mid-1500, Spanish Jesuits, many of them born in New Spain, began to arrive to Japan to preach Christianity. In 1597, general Toyotomi Hideyoshi, who is accredited with uniting the islands of Japan, prohibited the teaching of Christianity and ordered all missionaries to leave Japan. Several Jesuits did not leave and they were executed in Nagasaki.

In 1609, a Spanish galleon called San Francisco capsized near Ōtaki, Chiba while making its way from Manila to Acapulco. 370 castaways were rescued by Japanese fisherman. Among those rescued was the New Spanish governor of the Philippines; Rodrigo de Vivero. In Japan, de Vivero was able to travel to Tokyo and met with high level dignitaries and establish direct commercial relations between Japan and the Spanish empire via the Philippines. After spending some time travelling throughout the Japanese islands, de Vivero returned to Acapulco with a new ship built in Japan called the San Buenaventura and with some Japanese men on board. Once in Acapulco, de Vivero brought his mission to Mexico City and met with the Spanish viceroy, Luis de Velazco and communicated to him his report. In March 1611, the Spanish viceroy Veleazco sent a mission directly from Acapulco to Japan thanking the Japanese government for assisting his governor de Vivero and reimbursed them for the ship San Buenaventura, and giving them gifts in homage, one of them being a clock made in Madrid and it was to be the first clock that people of Japan had ever seen before.

In October 1613, the first Japanese diplomatic mission was sent to New Spain by Masamune Date, a regional strongman. This diplomatic mission was to be known as the Keichō embassy and it was the second diplomatic mission to travel to Europe after the first historic mission known as the Tenshō embassy. Date had built a new exploration ship called the Date Maru or San Juan Bautista which was to take the diplomatic party to the Americas. The party left Japan on 28 October 1613 towards Acapulco with a total of around 180 people on board, including ten samurai of the shōgun Tokugawa Ieyasu, 12 samurai from Sendai, 120 Japanese merchants; and sailors. The leader, Hasekura Tsunenaga met with the Spanish viceroy Diego Fernández de Córdoba. When the delegation arrived in Acapulco, a fight broke out in which a Japanese samurai stabbed a Spanish colonial soldier. This was witnessed and recorded by historian Chimalpahin; who was the grandson of an Aztec nobleman. In Mexico City, Hasekura met with several colonial leaders and offered the New Spanish government free commerce between the New Spanish territories and Japan and asked for a group of Christian missionaries to return to Japan. The diplomatic mission also offered to expel both English and Dutch citizens from the country because both nations were considered at the time to be enemies of the Spanish king. In June 1614, Hasekura left New Spain via Veracruz and continued on his journey to Spain to meet with the Spanish king leaving behind a small delegation. In Spain, Hasekura was baptized a Catholic and changed his name to Francisco Felipe Faxicura. Two years later in February 1617, Hasekura/Faxicura returned from Spain to Veracruz and traveled to Mexico City. Upon arrival to Mexico City, Hasekura was surprised to see that most members of his delegation that he had left behind, had married and integrated into the Mexican community. In 1620, Hasekura and his diplomatic mission set sailed and returned to Japan. On arrival, they were confronted with the fact the country had dramatically changed since their departure in 1613 and that anything related to Christianity had been banned. Hasekura and his delegation had to renounce their adopted religion. Since Hasekura's diplomatic mission to New Spain, Japan entered a time of isolation and refused to trade with foreign nations.

After the Meiji Restoration, in which the Empire of Japan officially reestablished diplomatic relations with various governments of the world, in Mexico arose interest to initiate official relations with the Empire of Japan. The expedition from Mexico to Japan in 1874, led by the Mexican scientist Francisco Díaz Covarrubias, was the reason why formal attempts were made between representatives of the governments of both countries to have diplomatic relations. At the end of Diaz Covarrubias' report, such action was recommended.

In 1874 (fifty-three years after Mexico declared independence from Spain in 1821), a Mexican scientific delegation headed by Francisco Díaz Covarrubias arrived in Japan to witness the transit of the planet Venus through a solar disc. Although the scientific delegation did not have much success, this mission did allow for formal diplomatic relations to begin between the two nations. In 1888 Foreign Ministers Matías Romero and Munemitsu Mutsu signed a Treaty of Amity, Commerce, and Navigation; which was to be Japan's first "equal" treaty with a foreign nation (as it did not grant Mexico any extra-territorial right or jurisdiction in Japan) and thus formally established diplomatic relations between the two nations.

World War II and post-war relations 
Since establishing diplomatic relations, contact between the two nations increased through trade and commerce. In May 1942, Mexico declared war on the Axis Powers, which included Japan, and joined World War II. The Escuadrón 201 was a squadron of fighter planes that fought against Japanese pilots at the Battle of Luzon, in the Philippines. After the war, diplomatic relations were restored and have continued unabated ever since.

The fact that Mexico agreed to sign a more just treaty in comparison to the treaties reached by other countries that favored the Europeans over the Japanese was seen as a grateful act for the Asian nation; and so the Mexican embassy in Tokyo was given a unique location right next to the Official Residence of the Prime Minister in the heart of the Japanese capital, in an area reserved for the room of senior rulers of the country. It remains there to this day.

Toshiro Mifune starred in the Mexican film Ánimas Trujano. To prepare for his role, Mifune studied tapes of Mexican actors speaking so that he could recite all of his lines in Spanish. When asked why he chose Mexico to act for his next movie, Mifune quoted, “Simply because, first of all, Mr. Ismael Rodríguez convinced me; secondly, because I was eager to work in beautiful Mexico, of great tradition; and thirdly, because the story and character of 'Animas Trujano' seemed very human to me”. The film was nominated for both a Golden Globe and an Oscar. Interestingly, Mifune gave a Japanese pistol to then-Mexican president Adolfo López Mateos when they met in Oaxaca.

High-level visits

High-level visits from Japan to Mexico

 Prime Minister Nobusuke Kishi (1959)
 Crown Prince (previous Emperor) Akihito (1964)
 Prime Minister Kakuei Tanaka (1974)
 Prime Minister Masayoshi Ōhira (1980)
 Prime Minister Zenkō Suzuki (1981)
 Prime Minister Toshiki Kaifu (1989)
 Crown Prince (current Emperor) Naruhito (1992, 2006)
 Prime Minister Ryutaro Hashimoto (1996)
 Prince Fumihito Akishino (1997, 2014)
 Prime Minister Junichiro Koizumi (2002, 2004)
 Prime Minister Yoshihiko Noda (2012)
 Prime Minister Shinzō Abe (2014)

High-level visits from Mexico to Japan

 President Adolfo López Mateos (1962)
 President Luis Echeverría Álvarez (1972)
 President José López Portillo (1978)
 President Miguel de la Madrid Hurtado (1986)
 President Carlos Salinas de Gortari (1990, 1993)
 President Ernesto Zedillo (1995, 1997, 1998)
 President Vicente Fox (2001, 2003)
 President Felipe Calderón (2008, January and November 2010)
 President Enrique Peña Nieto (2013)

Education

The Liceo Mexicano Japonés, a Japanese-Mexican school, serves elementary through high school students, including Mexican and Japanese nationals, residing in Mexico City.

Transportation
There are direct flights between Japan and Mexico with the following airlines: Aeroméxico and All Nippon Airways.

Trade
In April 2005, Japan and Mexico signed a free trade agreement (a.k.a. Agreement Between Japan and the United Mexican States for the Strengthening of the Economic Partnership). Since then, trade between the two nations has increased dramatically. In 2018, trade between the two nations amounted to US$20.3 billion. Most of the trade is in agricultural products, alcohol and automobile parts. Between 2005 and 2012, Japanese companies invested over US$12 billion in Mexico, mainly in the automobile industries. Both nations are also signatories to the Trans-Pacific Partnership.

Resident diplomatic missions 
 Japan has an embassy in Mexico City and a consulate-general in León,in the state of Guanajuato.
 Mexico has an embassy in Tokyo.

See also 
 Japanese community of Mexico City
 Japanese immigration to Mexico

References 

 
Mexico
Japan